
Year 187 BC was a year of the pre-Julian Roman calendar. At the time it was known as the Year of the Consulship of Lepidus and Flaminius (or, less frequently, year 567 Ab urbe condita). The denomination 187 BC for this year has been used since the early medieval period, when the Anno Domini calendar era became the prevalent method in Europe for naming years.

Events 
 By place 
 Seleucid Empire 
 The Seleucid king, Antiochus III, mounts a fresh expedition to the east of his kingdom in Luristan, where he is killed during an attempt to collect tribute from a temple at Elymais, Persia. He is succeeded by his son, Seleucus IV, who inherits an empire consisting of Syria (including Cilicia and Palestine), Mesopotamia, Babylonia, Media and Persia.

 Roman Republic 
 Tiberius Sempronius Gracchus is elected tribune of the plebs, in which capacity he is recorded as having saved Scipio Africanus from prosecution by interposing his veto. Tiberius is no friend nor political ally of Scipio's, but feels that the general's services to Rome merit his release from the threat of trial like any common criminal. Supposedly, in gratitude for this action, Scipio betrothes his youngest daughter, Cornelia, to him.
 The construction of the Via Aemilia, a trunk road in the north Italian plains, running from Ariminum (Rimini), on the Adriatic coast, to Placentia (Piacenza) on the river Padus (Po), is completed.

 Egypt 
 Queen Cleopatra I is appointed Vizier (Chief Minister) to the King Ptolemy V Epiphanes.

Deaths 
 Antiochus III the Great, Seleucid king of the Hellenistic Syrian Empire from 223 BC, who has rebuilt the empire in the East but failed in his attempt to challenge Roman ascendancy in Greece and Anatolia (b. c. 241 BC)

References